Madison is the county seat of Dane County and the capital city of the U.S. state of Wisconsin. As of the 2020 census the population was 269,840, making it the second-largest city in Wisconsin by population, after Milwaukee, and the 80th-largest in the U.S. The city forms the core of the Madison Metropolitan Area which includes Dane County and neighboring Iowa, Green, and Columbia counties for a population of 680,796. Madison is also the principal city of the Madison-Janesville-Beloit Combined Statistical Area which as of 2020 had a population of 910,246. Madison is named for American Founding Father and President James Madison.

Located on an isthmus and lands surrounding four lakes—Lake Mendota, Lake Monona, Lake Kegonsa and Lake Waubesa—the city is home to the University of Wisconsin–Madison, the Wisconsin State Capitol, the Overture Center for the Arts, and the Henry Vilas Zoo. Madison is home to an extensive network of parks and bike trails; it has the most parks and playgrounds per capita of any of the 100 largest U.S. cities and is one of five communities to have received a "Platinum Bicycle Friendly Community" rating from the League of American Bicyclists. Madison is also home to nine National Historic Landmarks, including several buildings designed by architect Frank Lloyd Wright, such as his 1937 Jacobs I House, which is a UNESCO World Heritage Site.

Residents of Madison are known as Madisonians. Madison has long been a center for progressive political activity, protests, and demonstrations, and contemporary Madison is considered the most politically liberal city in Wisconsin. The presence of the University of Wisconsin–Madison (the largest employer in the state) as well as other educational institutions has a significant impact on the economy, culture, and demographics of Madison.

As of 2021, Madison is the fastest-growing city in Wisconsin. Madison's economy features a large and growing technology sector, and the Madison area is home to the headquarters of Epic Systems, American Family Insurance, Exact Sciences, Promega, American Girl, Sub-Zero, Lands' End, Spectrum Brands, a regional office for Google, and the University Research Park, as well as many biotechnology and health systems startups. Madison is a popular visitor destination, with tourism generating over $1 billion for Dane County's economy in 2018. A booming population combined with a lack in the quantity of housing due to restrictive zoning density regulations have contributed to rising housing costs in many Madison neighborhoods, with a 23% increase in median rent between 2014 and 2019.

History

Native Americans

Before Europeans, humans inhabited the area in and around Madison for about 12,000 years. The Ho-Chunk called the region Taychopera (Ta-ko-per-ah), meaning "land of the four lakes" (Mendota, Monona, Waubesa, and Kegonsa). Effigy mounds, which had been constructed for ceremonial and burial purposes over 1,000 years earlier, dotted the rich prairies around the lakes.

Founding

Madison's modern origins begin in 1829, when former federal judge James Duane Doty purchased over a thousand acres (4 km2) of swamp and forest land on the isthmus between Lakes Mendota and Monona, with the intention of building a city in the Four Lakes region. He purchased 1,261 acres for $1,500. When the Wisconsin Territory was created in 1836 the territorial legislature convened in Belmont, Wisconsin. One of the legislature's tasks was to select a permanent location for the territory's capital. Doty lobbied aggressively for Madison as the new capital, offering buffalo robes to the freezing legislators and choice lots in Madison at discount prices to undecided voters. He had James Slaughter plat two cities in the area, Madison and "The City of Four Lakes", near present-day Middleton.

Doty named his city Madison for James Madison, the fourth President of the U.S. who had died on June 28, 1836, and he named the streets for the other 38 signers of the U.S. Constitution. Although the city existed only on paper, the territorial legislature voted on November 28, 1836 in favor of Madison as its capital, largely because of its location halfway between the new and growing cities around Milwaukee in the east and the long established strategic post of Prairie du Chien in the west, and between the highly populated lead mining regions in the southwest and Wisconsin's oldest city, Green Bay, in the northeast.

Expansion

The cornerstone for the Wisconsin capitol was laid in 1837, and the legislature first met there in 1838. On October 9, 1839, Kintzing Prichett registered the plat of Madison at the registrar's office of the then-territorial Dane County. Madison was incorporated as a village in 1846, with a population of 626. When Wisconsin became a state in 1848, Madison remained the capital, and the following year it became the site of the University of Wisconsin (now University of Wisconsin–Madison). The Milwaukee & Mississippi Railroad (a predecessor of the Milwaukee Road) connected to Madison in 1854. Madison incorporated as a city in 1856, with a population of 6,863, leaving the unincorporated remainder as a separate Town of Madison. The original capitol was replaced in 1863 and the second capitol burned in 1904. The current capitol was built between 1906 and 1917.

During the Civil War, Madison served as a center of the Union Army in Wisconsin. The intersection of Milwaukee, East Washington, Winnebago, and North Streets is known as Union Corners, because a tavern there was the last stop for Union soldiers before heading to fight the Confederates. Camp Randall, on the west side of Madison, was built and used as a training camp, a military hospital, and a prison camp for captured Confederate soldiers. After the war ended, the Camp Randall site was absorbed into the University of Wisconsin and Camp Randall Stadium was built there in 1917. In 2004 the last vestige of active military training on the site was removed when the stadium renovation replaced a firing range used for ROTC training.

1960s and 1970s

In the 1960s and 1970s, the Madison counterculture was centered in the neighborhood of Mifflin and Bassett streets, referred to as "Miffland". The area contained many three-story apartments where students and counterculture youth lived, painted murals, and operated the co-operative grocery store, the Mifflin Street Co-op. Residents of the neighborhood often came into conflict with authorities, particularly during the administration of Republican mayor Bill Dyke. Dyke was viewed by students as a direct antagonist in efforts to protest the Vietnam War because of his efforts to suppress local protests. The annual Mifflin Street Block Party became a focal point for protest, although by the late 1970s it had become a mainstream community party.

During the late 1960s and early 1970s, thousands of students and other citizens took part in anti-Vietnam War marches and demonstrations, with more violent incidents drawing national attention to the city and UW campus. These include:
 the 1967 student protest of Dow Chemical Company, with 74 injured;
 the 1969 strike to secure greater representation and rights for African-American students and faculty, which resulted in the involvement of the Wisconsin Army National Guard;
 the 1970 fire that caused damage to the Army ROTC headquarters housed in the University of Wisconsin Armory and Gymnasium, also known as the Red Gym; and
 the 1970 late-summer predawn ANFO bombing of the Army Mathematics Research Center in Sterling Hall, killing a postdoctoral researcher, Robert Fassnacht. (See Sterling Hall bombing)

These protests were the subject of the 1979 documentary The War at Home. David Maraniss's 2004 book, They Marched into Sunlight, incorporated the 1967 Dow protests into a larger Vietnam War narrative. Tom Bates wrote the book Rads on the subject. Bates wrote that Dyke's attempt to suppress the annual Mifflin Street Block Party "would take three days, require hundreds of officers on overtime pay, and engulf the student community from the nearby Southeast Dorms to Langdon Street's fraternity row. Tear gas hung like heavy fog across the Isthmus." In the fracas, student activist Paul Soglin, then a city alderman, was arrested twice and taken to jail. Soglin was later elected mayor of Madison, serving several times.

21st century

In early 2011, Madison was the site for large protests against a bill proposed by Governor Scott Walker that abolished almost all collective bargaining for public worker unions. The protests at the capitol ranged in size from 10,000 to over 100,000 people and lasted for several months.

Geography

The city completely surrounds the city of Monona, and the villages of Maple Bluff and Shorewood Hills. Madison shares borders with its largest suburb, Sun Prairie, and three other suburbs, Middleton, McFarland, and Fitchburg. Other suburbs include the city of Verona and the villages of Cottage Grove, DeForest, and Waunakee as well as Mount Horeb, Oregon, Stoughton, and Cross Plains.

The city is sometimes described as The City of Four Lakes, comprising the four successive lakes of the Yahara River: Lake Mendota ("Fourth Lake"), Lake Monona ("Third Lake"), Lake Waubesa ("Second Lake") and Lake Kegonsa ("First Lake"), although Waubesa and Kegonsa are not actually in Madison, but just south of it. A fifth smaller lake, Lake Wingra, is within the city as well; it is connected to the Yahara River chain by Wingra Creek. The Yahara flows into the Rock River, which flows into the Mississippi River. Downtown Madison is located on an isthmus between Lakes Mendota and Monona. The city's trademark of "Lake, City, Lake" reflects this geography.

Neighborhoods

Local identity varies throughout Madison, with over 120 officially recognized neighborhood associations, such as the east side Williamson-Marquette Neighborhood. Historically, the north, east, and south sides were blue collar while the west side was white collar, and to a certain extent this remains true. Students dominate on the University of Wisconsin campus and to the east into downtown, while to its south and in Shorewood Hills on its west, faculty have been a major presence since those neighborhoods were originally developed. The turning point in Madison's development was the university's 1954 decision to develop its experimental farm on the western edge of town; since then, the city has grown substantially along suburban lines.

Major commercial areas

Hilldale

The Hilldale area comprises the Hill Farms neighborhood, Sunset Village Neighborhood, and part of the suburb of Shorewood Hills. The area has long winding streets, and according to a planning document issued by the neighborhood association, a "suburban-like feel". The area is also a commercial district, and contains Hilldale Shopping Center, an outdoor shopping center containing restaurants, a movie theater, and national retail chains.

Capitol Square

The Capitol Square Area is Madison's central business district. It is home to high rise apartments, restaurants, and shopping outlets. It contains several museums and is home to the Wisconsin State Capitol building and the Monona Terrace. The capitol square holds a number of public events for the city of Madison including the Dane County Farmers' Market, Concerts on the Square, Taste of Madison and Art Fair on the Square. The area's nightlife is served by several bars and live music venues.

State Street

State Street, which links the University of Wisconsin campus with the Capitol Square, is lined with restaurants, espresso cafes, and shops. Only pedestrians, buses, emergency vehicles, delivery vehicles, and bikes are allowed on State Street. State Street is home to much of the nightlife of the University of Wisconsin–Madison, as it is the location of a number of bars and performance venues ranging from comedy clubs to multiple large theaters, including the Overture Center, which features local ballets and Broadway touring casts. State street is also home to Freakfest, the annual Halloween party in Madison. A newer event on State Street is the Madison Night Market that occurs four nights during the year.

Park Street

The Park Street Area is located in the south of Madison, and contains multiple official neighborhoods, including the Burr Oaks Neighborhood Association and Greenbush. It has been described as the "racially and economically diverse area of Madison". Park Street is home to ethnic restaurants and specialty grocery stores, as well as retail. Residential areas to the sides of Park Street tend to have smaller houses or condos, and a higher density of houses.

Monroe Street

The Dudgeon-Monroe neighborhood neighbors downtown Madison. It is located around Monroe Street, a commercial area which has local shops, coffee houses, dining and galleries. It is home to a neighborhood jazz fest and Wingra Park, where people can rent paddle boats and canoes at the boathouse on Lake Wingra.

Willy Street

The Marquette neighborhood sits on the near east side of Madison. Willy (Williamson) Street contains locally owned shops, restaurants, and entertainment establishments, as well as art galleries, and the Willy Street Co-op. The houses in the Marquette neighborhood fall into two separate historic districts, Third Lake Ridge Historic District and Marquette Bungalow Historic District. The area is also the location of festivals like the Waterfront Festival (June), La Fete de Marquette (July), Orton Park Festival (August), and Willy Street Fair (September). The Willy Street neighborhood is a hub for Madison's bohemian culture. Houses lining the street are often painted colorfully, and the area has several murals.

Climate 

Madison, along with the rest of the state, has a humid continental climate (Köppen: Dfa), characterized by variable weather patterns and a large seasonal temperature variance: winter temperatures can be well below freezing, with moderate to occasionally heavy snowfall and temperatures reaching  on 17 mornings annually; high temperatures in summer average in the lower 80s °F (27–28 °C), reaching  on an average 12 afternoons per year, with lower humidity levels than winter but higher than spring. Summer accounts for a greater proportion of annual rainfall, but winter still sees significant precipitation.

Demographics

2020 census

As of the census of 2020, the population was 269,840. Ethnically, the population was 8.7% Hispanic or Latino of any race. When grouping both Hispanic and non-Hispanic people together by race, the city was 71.0% White, 9.5% Asian, 7.4% Black or African American, 0.5% Native American, 0.1% Pacific Islander, 3.8% from other races, and 7.8% from two or more races.

The 2020 census population of the city included 548 people incarcerated in adult correctional facilities and 9,909 people in university student housing.

According  to the American Community Survey estimates for 2016-2020, the median income for a household in the city was $67,565, and the median income for a family was $96,502. Male full-time workers had a median income of $56,618 versus $48,760 for female workers. The per capita income for the city was $39,595. About 6.0% of families and 16.4% of the population were below the poverty line, including 11.3% of those under age 18 and 6.4% of those age 65 or over. Of the population age 25 and over, 95.9% were high school graduates or higher and 58.5% had a bachelor's degree or higher.

2010 census
As of the census of 2010, there were 233,209 people, 102,516 households, and 47,824 families residing in the city. The racial makeup of the city was 78.9 percent white, 7.3 percent black, 0.4 percent American Indian, 7.4 percent Asian, 2.9 percent other races, and 3.1 from two or more races. Hispanic or Latino of any race were 6.8 percent of the population.

There were 102,516 households, of which 22.2% had children under the age of 18 living with them, 35.1% were married couples living together, 8.4% had a female householder with no husband present, 3.2% had a male householder with no wife present, and 53.3% were non-families. 36.2% of all households were made up of individuals, and 7.5% had someone living alone who was 65 years of age or older. The average household size was 2.17 and the average family size was 2.87.

The median age in the city was 30.9 years. 17.5 percent of residents were under the age of 18; 19.6% were between the ages of 18 and 24; 31.4% were from 25 to 44; 21.9% were from 45 to 64; and 9.6% were 65 years of age or older. The gender makeup of the city was 49.2% male and 50.8% female.

Combined Statistical Area

Madison is the larger principal city of the Madison-Janesville-Beloit, WI CSA, a Combined Statistical Area that includes the Madison metropolitan area (Columbia, Dane, Green and Iowa counties), the Janesville-Beloit metropolitan area (Rock County), and the Baraboo micropolitan area (Sauk County). As of the 2020 census, the Madison MSA had a population of 680,796 and the Madison CSA had a population of 910,246.

Religion
Madison is the episcopal see for the Roman Catholic Diocese of Madison. Saint Raphael's Cathedral, damaged by arson in 2005 and demolished in 2008, was the mother church of the diocese. The steeple and spire survived and have been preserved with the intention they could be incorporated in the structure of a replacement building.

InterVarsity Christian Fellowship/USA has its headquarters in Madison.

The Wisconsin Evangelical Lutheran Synod has three churches in Madison: Eastside Lutheran Church, Our Redeemer Lutheran Church, and Wisconsin Lutheran Chapel.

The Evangelical Lutheran Synod has three churches in Madison: Grace Lutheran Church, Holy Cross Lutheran Church, and Our Saviour's Lutheran Church.

Bethel Lutheran Church of the Evangelical Church in America, in downtown Madison, is one of the largest Lutheran congregations in the country.

Most American Christian movements are represented in the city, including mainline denominations, evangelical, charismatic and fully independent churches, including an LDS stake. The city also has multiple Sikh Gurdwaras, Hindu temples, three mosques and several synagogues, a community center serving the Baháʼí Faith, a Quaker Meeting House, and a Unity Church congregation.

The nation's third largest congregation of Unitarian Universalists, the First Unitarian Society of Madison, makes its home in the historic Unitarian Meeting House, designed by one of its members, Frank Lloyd Wright.

Madison is home to the Freedom from Religion Foundation, a non-profit organization that promotes the separation of church and state.

Crime
There were 53 homicides reported by Madison Police from 2000 to 2009. The highest total was 10 in 2008. Police reported 28 murders from 2010 to 2015, with the highest year being 7 murders in 2011.

Economy

Madison's economy is marked by the sectors of tech business and state employment.

As of late 2018, the two largest employers in the Madison Metropolitan Area were the University of Wisconsin-Madison, and Epic Systems. The Wisconsin state government and the University of Wisconsin Hospital and Clinics remain the two major state employers. Madison's economy today is evolving from a government-based economy to a consumer services and high-tech base, particularly in the health, biotech, and advertising sectors. Beginning in the early 1990s, the city experienced a steady economic boom and has been less affected by recession than other areas of the state. Underpinning the boom is the development of high-tech companies, many fostered by UW–Madison working with local businesses and entrepreneurs to transfer the results of academic research into real-world applications, especially bio-tech applications.

Many businesses are attracted to Madison's skill base, taking advantage of the area's high level of education. 48.2% of Madison's population over the age of 25 holds at least a bachelor's degree.

State enterprises

As Madison is the State Capital of Wisconsin, it is home to many Wisconsin state agencies and bureaus. Madison also contains the University of Wisconsin-Madison, a research institution that employs 22,365 faculty and staff.

The University of Wisconsin Hospital and Clinics is an important regional teaching hospital and regional trauma center, with strengths in transplant medicine, oncology, digestive disorders, and endocrinology. Other Madison hospitals include St. Mary's Hospital, Meriter Hospital, and the VA Medical Center.

Business

The Madison metropolitan area is home to companies such as Spectrum Brands (formerly Rayovac), Trek, Alliant Energy, the Credit Union National Association (CUNA), MGE Energy, EatStreet, and Sub-Zero & Wolf Appliance. Insurance companies based in Madison include American Family Insurance, CUNA Mutual Group, and National Guardian Life. Technology companies in Madison include Broadjam, Zendesk, Full Compass Systems, Raven Software, and TDS Telecom.

Some economic growth in Madison is driven by biotech and health information technology. Biotech firms include Panvera (now part of Invitrogen), Exact Sciences, Promega, and Arrowhead Pharmaceuticals among others. The contract research organization Covance is a major employer in the city. Madison's community hackerspaces/makerspaces are Sector67, which serves inventors and entrepreneurs, and The Bodgery, which serves hobbyists, artists, and tinkerers. Start up incubators and connectors include StartingBlock, gener8tor and University Research Park. Epic Systems was based in Madison from 1979 to 2005, when it moved to a larger campus in the nearby Madison suburb of Verona. Other firms include Nordic, Forward Health, and Forte Research Systems.

Oscar Mayer was a Madison fixture for decades, and was a family business for many years before being sold to Kraft Foods. The Onion satirical newspaper, as well as the pizza chains Rocky Rococo and the Glass Nickel Pizza Company, originated in Madison.

Arts and culture

Food

The city is home to several James Beard Award winners, gastropubs, and farm-to-table restaurants.

Madison is home to unique foods such as the large spring-rolls sold from the food carts on the Capital Square and State Street, particularly in warmer months. Other foods that are unique to the area are cheese curds, served either fried with dipping sauce, such as ranch dressing, or "squeaky" (not cooked, so called because of the squeaking sound they often make against the teeth when chewed), usually served without dipping sauce. Another popular food is hot and spicy cheese bread, made by some Madison bakeries and available at farmer's markets around the city.

On Saturday mornings in the summer, the Dane County Farmers' Market is held around the Capitol Square, the largest producer-only farmers' market in the country. A smaller version of this market is held on Martin Luther King Boulevard on Wednesdays during the summer. In late fall, this market moves indoors, first as the Holiday Market at the Monona Terrace. Later it becomes the Late Winter Market at the Madison Senior Center. This market attracts numerous vendors who sell fresh produce, meat, cheese, and other products.

Some restaurants in Madison follow the general Wisconsin supper club practice of restaurants serving "Friday fish fry, Saturday prime rib special, Sunday chicken dinner special." 
The Great Taste of the Midwest craft beer festival, established in 1987 and the second-longest-running such event in North America, is held the second Saturday in August. The highly coveted tickets sell out within an hour of going on sale in May.

Architecture

Madison's architectural landmarks reflect a wide range of styles, from the densest cluster of Native American effigy mounds in the United States to the Beaux-Arts Wisconsin State Capitol, the Renaissance Revival University of Wisconsin Memorial Union and the Overture Center for the Arts, designed by postmodern architect César Pelli. Madison is home to eight buildings designed by influential Wisconsin-born modern architect Frank Lloyd Wright, more than any other city outside of the Chicago metropolitan area. Wright, who spent much of his childhood in Madison and studied briefly at the University of Wisconsin–Madison, was based at Taliesin in nearby Spring Green for most of his career. His designs in Madison include Monona Terrace, the city's lakefront convention center, as well as Wright's first Usonian house, the Herbert and Katherine Jacobs First House, which is a UNESCO World Heritage Site.

The height of Madison's skyline is limited by a state law that restricts building heights in the downtown area. The Wisconsin State Capitol dome was modeled after the dome of the U.S. Capitol, and was erected on the high point of the isthmus. Capitol Square is located in Madison's urban core.

The Harold C. Bradley House in the University Heights neighborhood was designed collaboratively by Louis H. Sullivan and George Grant Elmslie in 1908–1910, and now serves as the Sigma Phi Society chapter house.

The Overture Center for the Arts, opened 2004, and the adjacent Madison Museum of Contemporary Art, opened 2006, on State Street near the capitol were designed by architect César Pelli. Within the Overture Center are Overture Hall, Capitol Theater, and The Playhouse. Its modernist style, with simple expanses of glass framed by stone, was designed to complement nearby historic building facades.

The architectural firm Claude and Starck designed over 175 Madison buildings, and many are still standing, including Breese Stevens Field, Doty School (now condominiums), and many private residences.

Architecture on the University of Wisconsin campus includes many buildings designed or supervised by the firm J. T. W. Jennings, such as the Dairy Barn and Agricultural Hall, or by architect Arthur Peabody, such as the Memorial Union and Carillon Tower. Several campus buildings erected in the 1960s followed the brutalist architectural style. In 2005, the university embarked on a major redevelopment at the east end of its campus. The plan called for the razing of nearly a dozen 1950s to 1970s vintage buildings; the construction of new dormitories, administration, and classroom buildings; as well as the development of a new pedestrian mall extending to Lake Mendota. The campus now includes 12- to 14-story buildings.

Points of interest

 Alliant Energy Center / Veteran's Memorial Coliseum and Exhibition Hall
 Camp Randall Stadium
 Chazen Museum of Art
 Madison Museum of Contemporary Art
 Madison Children's Museum
 Henry Vilas Zoo
 The Kohl Center
 Mifflin Street, home to the annual Mifflin Street Block Party
 Monona Terrace Community and Convention Center designed by Frank Lloyd Wright
 Memorial Union
 Olbrich Botanical Gardens
 Overture Center for the Arts
 The Gates of Heaven Synagogue in James Madison Park is the eighth-oldest-surviving synagogue building in the U.S.
 State Street
 Williamson ("Willy") Street
 Smart Studios, Butch Vig and Steve Marker's longtime studio where many notable alternative rock records of the 1990s and 2000s were recorded and/or produced
 Unitarian Meeting House, another notable and tourable Frank Lloyd Wright structure, is adjacent to Madison city limits in suburban Shorewood Hills
 University of Wisconsin–Madison
 University of Wisconsin–Madison Arboretum
 University of Wisconsin Field House
 UW–Madison Geology Museum
 Wisconsin Historical Society/Wisconsin Historical Museum
 Wisconsin Veterans Museum
 Wisconsin State Capitol
 Lakeshore Nature Preserve, a campus-associated preserve which features notable long peninsula called Picnic Point

Nightlife

Much of the city's nightlife is centralized to the downtown area which includes a variety of bars, restaurants, and performance venues. State Street and the surrounding area are popular with tourists and University of Wisconsin-Madison students. Venues in the Capital Square neighborhood are popular with local young professionals and provide many happy hour specials. Another center of nightlife is the Williamson (Willy) Street Neighborhood. Madison is also home to a number of nightclubs, gay bars and live music venues. The Mifflin Street Block Party and the Freakfest Halloween Party also attract thousands of partygoers.

Music

Madison's music scene covers a spectrum of musical culture.

Several venues offer live music nightly, spreading from the historic Barrymore Theatre and High Noon Saloon on the east side to small coffee houses and wine bars. The biggest headliners sometimes perform at the Orpheum Theatre, the Overture Center, Breese Stevens Field, the Alliant Energy Center, or the UW Theatre on campus. Other major rock and pop venues include the Majestic Theatre, the Sylvee, and The Bartell. During the summer, the Memorial Union Terrace on the University of Wisconsin campus, offers live music five nights a week. The Union is located on the shores of Lake Mendota.

Concerts on the Square is a weekly Madison tradition during the summer. On Wednesday evenings, the Wisconsin Chamber Orchestra performs free concerts on the capitol's lawn, and people come to listen to the music while picnicking on the grass.

The Madison Scouts Drum and Bugle Corps has provided youth aged 16–22 opportunities to perform across North America every summer since 1938. The University of Wisconsin Marching Band is a local marching band.

Madison has a lively independent rock scene, and local independent record labels include Crustacean Records, Science of Sound, Kind Turkey Records, and Art Paul Schlosser Inc. A Dr. Demento and weekly live karaoke favorite is The Gomers, who have a Madison Mayoral Proclamation named after them. They have performed with fellow Wisconsin residents Les Paul and Steve Miller.

Madison is also home to other nationally known artists such as Paul Kowert of Punch Brothers, Mama Digdown's Brass Band, Clyde Stubblefield of Funky Drummer and James Brown fame, and musicians Roscoe Mitchell, Richard Davis, Ben Sidran, Sexy Ester and the Pretty Mama Sisters, Reptile Palace Orchestra, Ted Park, DJ Pain 1, Killdozer, Zola Jesus, VO5, Caustic, PHOX, Masked Intruder, and Lou & Peter Berryman, among others. The band Garbage formed in Madison in 1994, and has sold 17 million albums.

In the summer Madison hosts many music festivals, including the Waterfront Festival, the Willy St. Fair, Atwood Summerfest, the Isthmus Jazz Festival, the Orton Park Festival, 94.1 WJJO's Band Camp, Greekfest, the WORT Block Party and the Sugar Maple Traditional Music Festival, and the Madison World Music Festival sponsored by the Wisconsin Union Theater (held at the Memorial Union Terrace and at the Willy St. Fair in September). Past festivals include the Madison Pop Festival and Forward Music Festival (2009–2010.) One of the latest additions is the Fête de Marquette, taking place around Bastille Day at various east side locations. This new festival celebrates French music, with a focus on Cajun influences. Madison also hosts an annual electronic music festival, Reverence, and the Folk Ball, a world music and Folk dance festival held annually in January. Madison is home to the LBGTQA festival, Fruit Fest, celebrating queer culture and LGBT allies. Madison also plays host to the National Women's Music Festival. UW-Madison also hosts the annual music and arts festival, Revelry, on campus at the Memorial Union each spring. The festival is put on by students for students as an end of the year celebration on campus.

Art

Art museums include the UW–Madison's Chazen Museum of Art (formerly the Elvehjem Museum), and the Madison Museum of Contemporary Art, which annually organizes the Art Fair on the Square. Madison also has independent art studios, galleries, and arts organizations, with events such as Art Fair Off the Square. Other museums include Wisconsin Historical Museum (run by the Wisconsin Historical Society), the Wisconsin Veterans Museum, and the Madison Children's Museum.

Performing arts

The Madison Opera, the Madison Symphony Orchestra, Forward Theater Company, the Wisconsin Chamber Orchestra, and the Madison Ballet are some of the professional resident companies of the Overture Center for the Arts. The city is also home to a number of smaller performing arts organizations, including a group of theater companies that present in the Bartell Theatre, a former movie palace renovated into live theater spaces, and Opera for the Young, an opera company that performs for elementary school students across the Midwest. Music Theatre of Madison is a professional musical theater company that performs new and lesser-known musicals in a variety of venues. The Wisconsin Union Theater (a 1,300-seat theater) is home to seasonal attractions and is the main stage for Four Seasons Theatre, a community theater company specializing in musical theater, and other groups. The Young Shakespeare Players, a theater group for young people, performs uncut Shakespeare and George B. Shaw plays.

Community-based theater groups include Children's Theatre of Madison, Strollers Theatre, Madison Theatre Guild, the Mercury Players, and Broom Street Theater (which is no longer on Broom Street).

Madison has one comedy club, the Comedy Club on State (which has hosted the Madison's Funniest Comic competition every year since 2010), owned by the Paras family. Madison has other options for more alternative humor, featuring several improv groups, such as Atlas Improv Company, Monkey Business Institute, and open mic nights.

Madison is home to a large entertainment industry archive at the Wisconsin Center for Film and Theater Research, part of the Wisconsin Historical Society.

Other cultural events

The Madison metro area has a higher percentage of gay couples than any other city in the area outside of Chicago and Minneapolis.

Madison was host to Rhythm and Booms, a large fireworks celebration coordinated to music. It began with a fly-over by F-16s from the local Wisconsin Air National Guard. This celebration was the largest fireworks display in the Midwest in length, number of shells fired, and the size of its annual budget. Effective 2015, the event location was changed to downtown and renamed Shake The Lake.

There are several cooperative organizations in the Madison area, ranging from grocery stores (such as the Willy Street Cooperative) to housing co-ops (such as Madison Community Cooperative and Nottingham Housing Cooperative) to worker cooperatives (including an engineering firm, a wholesale organic bakery and a cab company).

Every April, the Wisconsin Film Festival is held in Madison. This five-day event features films from a variety of genres shown in theaters across the city. The University of Wisconsin–Madison Arts Institute sponsors the Film Festival.

Madison is known for its unique official bird. In 2009, the Madison Common Council voted to name the plastic pink flamingo as the official city bird.

Sports

Madison is known for having its athletics fan base centered on the University of Wisconsin-Madison.

The UW–Madison teams play their home-field sporting events in venues in and around Madison. The Wisconsin Badgers football team plays at Camp Randall Stadium where crowds of as many as 83,000 have attended games. The Wisconsin Badgers men's basketball and Wisconsin Badgers men's ice hockey teams play at the Kohl Center. Construction on the $76 million arena was completed in 1997. The Wisconsin Badgers women's ice hockey team plays at the LaBahn Arena. Some events are played at the county-owned Alliant Energy Center (formerly Dane County Memorial Coliseum) and the University-owned Wisconsin Field House.

In 2014, the Madison Capitols made their return to the Madison area following 19 years of dormancy. The Capitols play their home games at Bob Suter's Capitol Ice Arena following three years at Alliant Energy Center.

On May 17, 2018, it was announced that Forward Madison FC would become Madison's first professional soccer team, and are members of USL League One. They play their home matches at the historic Breese Stevens Field.

Madison is home to the Madison Mallards, a college wood-bat summer baseball league team in the Northwoods League. They play in Warner Park on the city's north side from June to August.

Prominent sports teams

Former teams

The Madison Muskies, a Class A, Midwest League affiliate of the Oakland A's, left town in 1993 after 11 seasons. The Madison Hatters, another Class A, Midwest League team, played in Madison for only the 1994 season. The Madison Black Wolf, an independent Northern League franchise lasted five seasons (1996–2000), before decamping for Lincoln, Nebraska.

Parks and recreation

Parks
Madison has  of park space, which is 13.5% of the city's total area. Parks in the city include James Madison Park, which has views of Lake Mendota; Frank W. Hoyt Park, which is listed on the National Register of Historic Places; Garner Park, where the Madison Opera holds an "Opera in the Park" event; and Warner Park, which is home to the stadium for the Madison Mallards baseball team.

Recreation

During the winter months, sports enthusiasts enjoy ice-boating, ice skating, ice hockey, ice fishing, cross-country skiing, and snowkiting. During the rest of the year, outdoor recreation includes sailing on the local lakes, bicycling, and hiking.

Madison is known for its extensive biking infrastructure, with numerous bike paths and bike lanes throughout the city. Several of these bike paths connect to state trails, such as the Capital City State Trail, Military Ridge State Trail, and Badger State Trail. In addition to these bike paths, most city streets have designated bike lanes or are designated as bicycle boulevards, which give high priority to bicyclists. In 2015 Madison was awarded platinum level Bicycle Friendly Community designation from the League of American Bicyclists, one of only five cities in the US to receive this (highest) level.

Amateur sports
Madison has an active amateur sports scene, with ultimate, endurance sports, and soccer being common pastimes.

Madison has several active ultimate disc leagues organized through the nonprofit Madison Ultimate Frisbee Association. In 2013, the Madison Radicals, a professional ultimate frisbee team, debuted in the city.

Madison is home to several endurance sports racing events, such as the Crazylegs Classic, the CrossFit Games, Paddle and Portage, the Mad City Marathon, and Ironman Wisconsin, which attracts over 45,000 spectators.

The Wisconsin Rugby Club, the 1998 and 2013 USA Rugby Division II National Champions, and the Wisconsin Women's Rugby Football Club are the state's only Division I women's rugby team. All Madison rugby teams play within the Wisconsin Rugby Football Union—the Midwest Rugby Union and USA Rugby.

The Madison Curling Club was founded in 1921. Team Spatola of the Madison Curling Club won the 2014 Women's US National Championship. Team members are: Nina Spatola, Becca Hamilton, Tara Peterson, Sophie Brorson.

Madison's Gaelic sports club hosts a hurling team organized as The Hurling Club of Madison and a Gaelic football club with men's and women's teams.

The roller derby league, Madison Roller Derby, was formed in Madison in 2004 and is a member of the Women's Flat Track Derby Association. Madison is also home to Wisconsin United Roller Derby, a member league of the Men's Roller Derby Association.

The adult women's ice hockey teams (Thunder, Lightning, Freeze, UW–B and C teams) play in the Women's Central Hockey League.

The Blackhawk Ski Club, formed in 1947, provides ski jumping, cross country skiing and alpine skiing. The club's programs have produced several Olympic ski jumpers, two Olympic ski jumping coaches and one Olympic ski jumping director. The club had the first Nordic ski facility with lighted night jumping.

As of 2017, the CrossFit Games have been held at the Alliant Energy Center. After seven years at the StubHub Center in Carson, California, the Games moved to Madison for an initial three-year contract. CrossFit chose the multi-building entertainment venue, which encompasses , after posting a national request for proposals.

Government
City voters have supported the Democratic Party in national elections in the last half-century, and a liberal and progressive majority is generally elected to the city council. Detractors often refer to Madison as "77 square miles surrounded by reality", a phrase coined by former Wisconsin Republican governor Lee S. Dreyfus, while campaigning in 1978. In 2013, there was a motion in the city council to turn Dreyfus' humor into the official city "punchline," but it was voted down by the city council.

The city's voters are generally much more liberal than voters in the rest of Wisconsin. For example, 76% of Madison voters voted against a 2006 state constitutional amendment to ban gay marriage, even though the ban passed statewide with 59% of the vote.

In 1992, a local third party, Progressive Dane, was founded. City policies supported in the Progressive Dane platform have included an inclusionary zoning ordinance, later abandoned by the mayor and a majority of the city council, and a city minimum wage. The party holds several seats on the Madison City Council and Dane County Board of Supervisors, and is aligned variously with the Democratic and Green parties.

Madison has a mayor-council system of government. Madison's city council, known as the Common Council, consists of 20 members, one from each district. The mayor is elected in a citywide vote.

Melissa Agard (D) and Kelda Roys (D) represent Madison in the Wisconsin State Senate, and Jimmy P. Anderson (D), Samba Baldeh (D), Francesca Hong (D), Sheila Stubbs (D), and Lisa Subeck (D) represent Madison in the Wisconsin State Assembly.

Ron Johnson (R) and Tammy Baldwin (D) represent Madison, and all of Wisconsin, in the United States Senate. Baldwin is a Madison resident; she represented the 2nd from 1999 to 2013 before handing it to Pocan.

Election results

Education

The Madison Metropolitan School District serves the city while a variety of other districts serve the surrounding area. With an enrollment of approximately 25,000 students in 46 schools, it is the second largest school district in Wisconsin behind the Milwaukee School District. The five public high schools are Vel Phillips Memorial, Madison West, Madison East, La Follette, and Malcolm Shabazz City High School, an alternative school.

Among private church-related high schools are Abundant Life Christian School, Edgewood High School, near the Edgewood College campus, and St. Ambrose Academy, a Catholic school offering grades 6 through 12. Madison Country Day School is a private high school with no religious affiliation.

The city is home to the University of Wisconsin–Madison, Edgewood College and Madison Area Technical College, giving the city a post-secondary student population of nearly 55,000. The University of Wisconsin accounts for the vast majority of students, with an enrollment of roughly 44,000, of whom 31,750 are undergraduates.

Additional degree programs are available through satellite campuses of Cardinal Stritch University, Concordia University-Wisconsin, Globe University, Lakeland College, the University of Phoenix, and Upper Iowa University. Madison also has a non-credit learning community with multiple programs and many private businesses also offering classes.

Media

Print

Madison is home to an extensive and varied number of print publications, reflecting the city's role as the state capital and its diverse political, cultural and academic population. The Wisconsin State Journal (weekday circulation: ~95,000; Sundays: ~155,000) is published in the mornings, while its sister publication, The Capital Times (Thursday supplement to the Journal) is published online daily, with two printed editions a week. Though jointly operated under the name Capital Newspapers, the Journal is owned by the national chain Lee Enterprises, and the Times is independently owned. Wisconsin State Journal is the descendant of the Wisconsin Express, a paper founded in the Wisconsin Territory in 1839. The Capital Times was founded in 1917 by William T. Evjue, a business manager for the State Journal who disagreed with that paper's editorial criticisms of Wisconsin Republican Senator Robert M. La Follette, Sr. for his opposition to U.S. entry into World War I.

The free weekly alternative newspaper Isthmus (weekly circulation: ~65,000) was founded in Madison in 1976. The Onion, a satirical weekly, was founded in Madison in 1988 and published from there until it moved to New York in 2001. Two student newspapers are published during the academic year, The Daily Cardinal (Mon–Fri circulation: ~10,000) and The Badger Herald (Mon–Fri circulation: ~16,000). Other specialty print publications focus on local music, politics and sports, including The Capital City Hues, The Madison Times, Madison Magazine, The Simpson Street Free Press, Umoja Magazine, and fantasy-sports web site RotoWire.com. Local community blogs include Althouse and dane101.

Madison is associated with "Fighting Bob" La Follette and the Progressive movement. La Follette's magazine, The Progressive, founded in 1909, is still published in Madison. It is a far left-wing periodical that may be best known for the attempt of the U.S. government in 1979 to suppress one of its articles before publication. The magazine eventually prevailed in the landmark First Amendment case, United States v. The Progressive, Inc. During the 1970s, there were two radical weeklies published in Madison, known as TakeOver and Free for All, as well as a Madison edition of the Bugle-American underground newspaper.

Radio

Madison has three large media companies that own the majority of the commercial radio stations within the market. These companies consist of iHeartMedia, Entercom Communications, and Mid-West Family Broadcasting as well as other smaller broadcasters. Madison is home to Mid-West Family Broadcasting, which is an independently owned broadcasting company that originated and is headquartered in Madison. Mid-West Family owns radio stations throughout the state and the Midwest.

Madison hosts two volunteer-operated and community-oriented radio stations, WORT and WSUM. WORT Community Radio (89.9 FM), founded in 1975, is one of the oldest volunteer-powered radio stations in the United States. A listener-sponsored community radio station, WORT offers locally produced diverse music and talk programming. WSUM (91.7 FM) is a free-form student radio station programmed and operated almost entirely by students.

Madison's Wisconsin Public Radio station, WHA, was one of the first radio stations in the nation to begin broadcasting. Public radio programs that originate at the WPR studios include Michael Feldman's Whad'Ya Know?, Zorba Pastor On Your Health, To the Best of Our Knowledge,Calling All Pets, and the longest running radio program in America, Chapter a Day.

WXJ-87 is the NOAA Weather Radio All Hazards station on Madison's west side, with broadcasts originating from the National Weather Service in Sullivan, Wisconsin.

TV

Madison has six commercial stations, two public television stations and two religious stations. The commercial stations consist of WISC-TV "News 3 Now" (CBS), WMTV "NBC 15" (NBC), WKOW-TV "27 News" (ABC), WMSN-TV "FOX 47" (Fox), WIFS "Wisconsin's 57" (Ion) and WZCK-LD. Religious stations consist of WMWD-LD (Daystar) and W23BW-D (3ABN). Madison has two public television stations: WHA-TV, which is owned by the University of Wisconsin–Extension and airs throughout the state with the exception of Milwaukee, and Madison City Channel, which is owned and operated by the City of Madison covering city governmental affairs.

Infrastructure

Transportation
Madison is served by the Dane County Regional Airport, which serves nearly 2.2 million passengers annually. Most major general aviation operations take place at Morey Field in Middleton  from Madison's city center. Madison Metro operates bus routes throughout the city and to some neighboring suburbs. Madison has four taxicab companies (Union, Badger, Madison, and Green), and several companies provide specialized transit for individuals with disabilities. Several carsharing services are also available in Madison, including Community Car, a locally owned company, and U-Haul subsidiary Uhaul Car Share.

Starting from the last decades of the 20th century, Madison has been among the leading cities for bicycling as a form of transportation, with about 3% of working residents pedaling on their journey to work. The share of Madison workers who bicycled to work increased to 5.3% by 2014. The 2016 survey by American Community Survey indicated that 65.7% of working Madison residents commuted by driving alone, 6.7% carpooled, 8.6% used public transportation, and 8.5% walked. About 6% used all other forms of transportation, including bicycles, motorcycles, and taxis. About 4.5% worked at home. According to Walk Score, Madison has an overall 48 out of 100 in walkability, making it a "largely car dependent city", and a 65 out of 100 for bicycling. However, the State-Langdon and Downtown areas scored significantly higher, 94 and 93 for walkability, and 87 and 89 for biking, respectively.

In 2015, 11.2% of Madison households were without a car, which was unchanged in 2016. The national average was 8.7% in 2016. Madison averaged 1.5 cars per household in 2016, compared to a national average of 1.8 per household.

Railways

Passenger train service between Madison and Chicago on the Sioux and the Varsity was provided by the Chicago, Milwaukee, St. Paul and Pacific Railroad (Milwaukee Road) until 1971. The Chicago and North Western Railway also provided service to the east side of Madison, ending in 1965. A high-speed rail route from Chicago through Milwaukee and Madison to Minneapolis–Saint Paul, Minnesota, was proposed as part of the Midwest Regional Rail Initiative. Funding for the railway connecting Madison to Milwaukee was approved in January 2010, but then Governor-elect Scott Walker's opposition to the project led the Federal Railroad Administration to retract the $810 million in funding and reallocate it to projects in other states. Plans to establish Amtrak service within the city of Madison were revived in 2021, pending federal legislative action, Madison is again slated to receive a rail link to Chicago via Milwaukee, likely with an expansion of the Hiawatha Service. Longer-term plans include a connection to the Twin Cities, potentially via Eau Claire; however, this has not been officially established at this time.  The city is served by the Columbus Amtrak station  to the northeast with once daily trains to Chicago, Portland, OR and Seattle, WA and stops in between via the Empire Builder route. While located outside of the city proper, the station is listed on Amtrak timetables as Madison's official stop in addition to thruway bus services within the city. 

Railroad freight services are provided to Madison by the Wisconsin and Southern Railroad (WSOR) and the Canadian Pacific Railway (CP) under its legal trading alias, the Soo Line Railroad.

Buses

In addition to public transportation, regional buses connect Madison to Milwaukee, Chicago, Minneapolis–Saint Paul, and many other communities. Badger Bus, which connects Madison and Milwaukee, runs several trips daily. Greyhound Lines, a nationwide bus company, serves Madison on its Chicago, Milwaukee, and Minneapolis–Saint Paul route. Van Galder Bus Company, a subsidiary of Coach USA, provides transportation through Rockford to Chicago—stopping at Union Station, O'Hare Airport, and Midway Airport. Jefferson Lines provides transportation to Minneapolis–Saint Paul via La Crosse. Megabus provides limited-stop service to Chicago and Minneapolis–Saint Paul. Lamers Bus Lines has once-daily trips from Madison to Wausau, Dubuque, and Green Bay.

Highways

Interstate 39 (I-39), I-90 and I-94 run along the far east side of the city, connecting to Janesville to the south, Milwaukee to the east, and to Portage, La Crosse, Eau Claire, and Wausau heading north and northwest.

U.S. Highway 151 (US 151) runs through downtown and serves as the main thoroughfare through the northeast (as Washington Avenue) and south-central parts (as Park Street) of the city, connecting Madison with Dubuque, Iowa to the southwest and Fond du Lac and Manitowoc to the northeast.

US 12, frequently referred to by locals as the Beltline, is a six- to eight-lane freeway serving the south and west sides of Madison and is the main link from the western suburb of Middleton to Cambridge. Southeast of the area, US 12 connects to Lake Geneva, and going northwest, it heads to Wisconsin Dells.

US 18 is also a component highway of the Beltine, continuing south along US 151 and east towards Waukesha and Milwaukee.

Public safety

Madison Police Department

The Madison Police Department is the law enforcement agency in the city led by Police Chief Shon Barnes. The department has six districts: Central, East, North, South, West and Midtown District

Special units in the police department include:

 K9 Unit
 Crime Scene Unit
 Forensic Unit
 Narcotics and Gangs Task Force
 Parking Enforcement
 Traffic Enforcement Safety Team
 S.W.A.T Team
 Special Events Team
 C.O.P.S (Safety Education)
 Mounted Patrol
 Crime Stoppers
 Amigos en Azul

The Madison Police Department was criticized for absolving Officer Steve Heimsness of any wrongdoing in the November 2012 shooting death of an unarmed man, Paul Heenan. The department's actions resulted in community protests, including demands that the shooting be examined and reviewed by an independent investigative body. WisconsinWatch.org called into question the MPD's facts and findings, stating that the use of deadly force by Heimsness was unwarranted. There were calls for an examination of the Madison Police Department's rules of engagement and due process for officers who use lethal force in the line of duty.

Community criticism of the department's practices resurfaced after MPD officer Matt Kenny shot Tony Robinson, an unarmed man. The shooting was particularly controversial given the context of the ongoing Black Lives Matter movement. Due to new Wisconsin state legislation that addresses the mechanisms under which officer-on-civilian violence is handled by state prosecutors, proceedings were handed over to a special unit of the Wisconsin Department of Justice in Madison. On March 27, 2015, the state concluded its investigation and gave its findings to Ismael Ozanne, the district attorney of Dane County. On May 12, 2015, Ozanne determined that the shooting was justified self-defense.

Madison Fire Department

The Madison Fire Department (MFD) provides fire protection and emergency medical services to the city. The MFD operates out of 14 fire stations, with a fleet of 12 engines, 5 ladders, 2 rescue squads, 2 hazmat units, a lake rescue team, and 9 ambulances. The MFD is contracted to provide fire and EMS services to the suburban enclave village of Shorewood Hills and also provides mutual aid to surrounding communities. In 2021 MFD in conjunction with Journey Mental Health, launched an emergency mental health response team consisting of a paramedic and social work to respond to mental health emergencies, the program initially launched in the Isthmus area and has expanded citywide in 2022.

Notable people

Nicknames

Over the years, Madison has acquired nicknames and slogans that include:
 Mad City
 Madtown
 The Berkeley of the Midwest
 77 square miles surrounded by reality
 Four Lakes City
People's Republic of Madison

Sister cities

Madison is twinned with:

 Arcatao, El Salvador (1986)
 Bahir Dar, Ethiopia (2019)
 Camagüey, Cuba (1994)
 Freiburg im Breisgau, Germany (1988)
 Kanifing, Gambia (2016)
 Mantua, Italy (2001)
 Obihiro, Japan (2003)
 Tepatitlán de Morelos, Mexico (2012)
 Vilnius, Lithuania (1988)

See also
 List of tallest buildings in Madison

Explanatory notes

References

Further reading

 Bates, Tom, Rads: The 1970 Bombing of the Army Math Research Center at the University of Wisconsin–Madison and Its Aftermath (1993) 
 Durrie, Daniel S. A History of Madison, the Capital of Wisconsin; Including the Four Lake Country. Madison: Atwood & Culver, 1874.
 Madison, Dane County and Surrounding Towns. Madison: Wm. J. Park & Co., 1877.
 Maraniss, David, They Marched Into Sunlight: War and Peace Vietnam and America October 1967 (2003)   (about the Dow Chemical protest, and a battle in Vietnam that took place the previous day)
 Mollenhoff, David V. Madison, a history of the formative years (Univ of Wisconsin Press, 2003).
 Nolen, John. Madison: a Model City. Boston: 1911.
 Thwaites, Reuben Gold. The Story of Madison. J. N. Purcell, 1900.

External links

 
 Greater Madison Convention & Visitors Bureau
 The State of Wisconsin Collection presented by the UW Digital Collections Center includes digital resources on Madison, including:
 Historical County Plat Maps from South Central Wisconsin and Early Madison City Directories
 Sanborn fire insurance maps: 1885 1892 1898 1902 1908

 
Cities in Wisconsin
Cities in Dane County, Wisconsin
Isthmuses of the United States
Populated places established in 1836
County seats in Wisconsin
Madison, Wisconsin, metropolitan statistical area
1836 establishments in Wisconsin Territory